José Enrique García Duarte (born December 23, 1967 in Salto, Uruguay) is a Uruguayan football manager and former player. He earned three caps for the Uruguay national team.

External links
 
 

1967 births
Living people
Uruguayan footballers
Uruguay international footballers
Uruguayan expatriate footballers
Association football forwards
Association football midfielders
Uruguayan football managers
Club Nacional de Football players
Atlante F.C. footballers
Deportivo Español footballers
Club Necaxa footballers
Irapuato F.C. footballers
San Luis F.C. players
Correcaminos UAT footballers
Uruguayan Primera División players
Argentine Primera División players
Liga MX players
Ascenso MX players
Expatriate footballers in Argentina
Expatriate footballers in Mexico
Uruguayan expatriate sportspeople in Argentina
Uruguayan expatriate sportspeople in Mexico
Footballers from Salto, Uruguay